Pope Clement XI (r. 1700–1721) created 69 cardinals in 15 consistories:

17 December 1703 
 Francesco Pignatelli, Theat., archbishop of Naples – cardinal-priest of SS. Marcellino e Pietro (received the title on 11 February 1704), then cardinal-bishop of Sabina (26 April 1719), cardinal-bishop of Frascati (12 June 1724), cardinal-bishop of Porto e S. Rufina (19 November 1725), † 5 December 1734

17 May 1706 

 Francesco Martelli, titular patriarch of Jerusalem– cardinal-priest of S. Eusebio (received the title on 25 June 1706), † 28 September 1717
 Giovanni Alberto Badoer, patriarch of Venice – cardinal-priest of S. Marcello (received the title on 25 June 1706), then cardinal-priest of S. Marco (11 July 1712), † 17 May 1714
 Lorenzo Casoni, titular archbishop of Cesarea – cardinal-priest of S. Bernardo alle Terme (received the title on 25 June 1706), then cardinal-priest of S. Pietro in Vincoli (21 January 1715), † 19 November 1720
 Lorenzo Corsini, titular archbishop of Nicomedia, treasurer general of the Apostolic Camera – cardinal-priest of S. Susanna (received the title on 25 June 1706), then cardinal-priest of S. Pietro in Vincoli (16 December 1720), cardinal-bishop of Frascati (19 November 1725); became Pope Clement XII on 12 July 1730, † 6 February 1740
 Lorenzo Fieschi, archbishop of Genoa – cardinal-priest of S. Maria della Pace (received the title on 25 June 1706), † 1 May 1726
 Francesco Acquaviva d'Aragona, titular archbishop of Larissa, nuncio in Spain – cardinal-priest of S. Bartolomeo all'Isola (received the title on 8 June 1707), then cardinal-priest of S. Cecilia (28 January 1709), cardinal-bishop of Sabina (12 June 1724), † 9 January 1725
 Tommaso Ruffo, titular archbishop of Nicea – cardinal-priest of S. Lorenzo in Panisperna (received the title on 25 June 1706), then cardinal-priest of S. Maria in Trastevere (28 January 1709), cardinal-bishop of Palestrina (1 July 1726), cardinal-bishop of Porto e S. Rufina (3 September 1738), cardinal-bishop of Ostia e Velletri (29 August 1740), † 16 February 1753
 Orazio Filippo Spada, bishop of Lucca, nuncio in Poland – cardinal-priest of S. Onofrio (received the title on 21 March 1707), † 28 June 1724
 Filippo Antonio Gualterio, archbishop of Imolo, nuncio in France – cardinal-priest of S. Crisogono (received the title on 30 April 1708), then cardinal-priest of S. Cecilia (29 January 1725), cardinal-priest of S. Prassede (31 July 1726), † 21 April 1728
 Christian August von Sachsen-Zeitz, bishop of Györ – cardinal-priest without the title, † 22 August 1725
 Rannuzio Pallavicino, vice-camerlengo of the Holy Roman Church and governor of Rome – cardinal-priest of S. Agnese fuori le mura (received the title on 25 June 1706), † 30 June 1712
 Carlo Colonna – cardinal-deacon of S. Maria della Scala (received the title on 25 June 1706), then cardinal-deacon of S. Angelo in Pescheria (6 May 1715), cardinal-deacon of S. Agata in Suburra (24 July 1730), † 8 July 1739
 Giandomenico Paracciani – cardinal-priest of S. Anastasia (received the title on 25 June 1706), † 9 May 1721
 Alessandro Caprara – cardinal-priest of SS. Nereo ed Achilleo (received the title on 25 June 1706), † 9 June 1711
 Joseph-Emmanuel de la Trémoille – cardinal-priest of SS. Trinita al Monte Pincio (received the title on 25 June 1706), † 10 January 1720
 Pietro Priuli – cardinal-deacon of S. Adriano (received the title on 25 June 1706), then cardinal-priest of S. Marco (6 May 1720), † 28 January 1728
 Nicola Grimaldi, secretary of the S. C. of Bishops and Regulars – cardinal-deacon of S. Maria in Cosmedin (received the title on 25 June 1706), then cardinal-priest of S. Matteo in Merulana (8 June 1716), † 25 October 1717
 Carlo Agostino Fabroni, secretary of the S. C. of Propaganda Fide – cardinal-priest of S. Agostino (received the title on 25 June 1706), † 19 September 1727
 Giuseppe Vallemani, titular archbishop of Athens (created in pectore, published on 1 August 1707) – cardinal-priest of S. Maria degli Angeli (received the title on 28 November 1707), † 15 December 1725

Gabriele Filipucci declined the promotion to the cardinalate.

7 June 1706 
 Michelangelo Conti, titular archbishop of Tarso, nuncio in Portugal – cardinal-priest of SS. Quirico e Giulitta (received the title on 23 February 1711), became Pope Innocent XIII on 8 May 1721, † 7 March 1724

1 August 1707 
 Charles-Thomas Maillard De Tournon, titular patriarch of Antioch – cardinal-priest without the title, † 8 June 1710

15 April 1709 
 Ulisse Giuseppe Gozzadini, titular archbishop of Teodosia, secretary of the Briefs to the Princes – cardinal-priest of S. Croce in Gerusalemme (received the title on 19 June 1709), † 20 March 1728
 Antonio Francesco Sanvitale, archbishop of Urbino (created in pectore, published on 22 July 1709) – cardinal-priest of S. Pietro in Montorio (received the title on 9 September 1709), † 17 December 1714

23 December 1711 

 Annibale Albani, nephew of the Pope – cardinal-deacon of S. Eustachio (received the title on 2 March 1712), then cardinal-deacon of S. Maria in Cosmedin (8 June 1716), cardinal-priest of S. Clemente (6 July 1722), cardinal-bishop of Sabina (24 July 1730), cardinal-bishop of Porto e S. Rufina (9 September 1743), † 21 October 1751

18 May 1712 

 Gianantonio Davia, archbishop of Rimini – cardinal-priest of S. Callisto (received the title on 30 August 1713), then cardinal-priest of S. Pietro in Vincoli (19 November 1725), cardinal-priest of S. Lorenzo in Lucina (11 February 1737), † 11 January 1740
 Agostino Cusani, bishop of Pavia – cardinal-priest of S. Maria del Popolo (received the title on 30 January 1713), 27 December 1730
 Giulio Piazza, bishop of Faenza – cardinal-priest of S. Lorenzo in Panisperna (received the title on 16 April 1714), 23 April 1726
 Antonio Felice Zondadari (elder), titular archbishop of Damasco – cardinal-priest of S. Balbina (received the title on 23 September 1715), then cardinal-priest of S. Prassede (9 April 1731), † 23 November 1737
 Armand Gaston Maximilien de Rohan, bishop of Strasbourg – cardinal-priest of SS. Trinita al Monte Pincio (received the title on 16 June 1721), † 19 July 1749
 Nuno da Cunha e Ataíde, titular bishop of Targa, inquisitor general of Portugal – cardinal-priest of S. Anastasia (received the title on 16 June 1721), † 3 December 1750
 Wolfgang Hannibal von Schrattenbach, bishop of Olomouc – cardinal-priest of S. Marcello (received the title on 7 December 1714), † 22 July 1722
 Luigi Priuli – cardinal-priest of S. Marcello (received the title on 11 July 1712), then cardinal-priest of S. Marco (28 May 1714), † 15 March 1720
 Giuseppe Maria Tomasi di Lampedusa, Theat. – cardinal-priest of SS. Silvestro e Martino (received the title on 11 July 1712), † 1 January 1713
 Giovanni Battista Tolomei, S.J. – cardinal-priest of S. Stefano al Monte Celio (received the title on 11 July 1712), 19 January 1726
 Francesco Maria Casini, O.F.M.Cap. – cardinal-priest of S. Prisca (received the title on 11 July 1712), † 14 February 1719
 Luigi Pico della Mirandola, titular patriarch of Constantinople (created in pectore, published on 26 September 1712) – cardinal-priest of S. Silvestro in Capite (received the title on 21 November 1712), then cardinal-priest of S. Prassede (24 April 1728), cardinal-bishop of Albano (9 April 1731), cardinal-bishop of Porto e S. Rufina (29 August 1740), † 10 August 1743
 Giovanni Battista Bussi, archbishop of Ancona (created in pectore, published on 26 September 1712) – cardinal-priest of S. Maria in Aracoeli (received the title on 30 January 1713), † 23 December 1726
 Pier Marcellino Corradini, titular archbishop of Athens (created in pectore, published on 26 September 1712) – cardinal-priest of S. Giovanni a Porta Latina (received the title on 21 November 1712), then cardinal-priest of S. Maria in Trastevere (11 September 1726), cardinal-bishop of Frascati (15 December 1734), † 8 February 1743
 Curzio Origo (created in pectore, published on 26 September 1712) – cardinal-deacon of S. Maria in Domnica (received the title on 21 November 1712), then cardinal-deacon of S. Eustachio (1 July 1716), cardinal-priest of S. Eustachio (20 March 1726), † 18 March 1737
 Manuel Arias y Porres, archbishop of Seville (created in pectore, published on 30 January 1713) – cardinal-priest without the title, † 16 November 1717
 Benito de Sala y de Caramany, bishop of Barcelona (created in pectore, published on30 January 1713) – cardinal-priest without the title, † 2 July 1715
 Melchior de Polignac (created in pectore, published on30 January 1713) – cardinal-deacon of S. Maria in Portico (received the title on 27 September 1724), then cardinal-priest of S. Maria in Via (20 November 1724), cardinal-priest of S. Maria degli Angeli (19 December 1725), † 20 November 1741

30 January 1713 
 Benedetto Odescalchi-Erba, archbishop of Milan, nuncio in Poland – cardinal-priest of SS. Nereo ed Achilleo (received the title on 1 April 1715), then cardinal-priest of SS. XII Apostoli (29 January 1725), † 13 December 1740
 Damian Hugo Philipp von Schönborn (created in pectore, published on 29 May 1715) – cardinal-deacon of S. Nicola in Carcere (received the title on 16 June 1721), then cardinal-priest of S. Pancrazio (10 September 1721), cardinal-priest of S. Maria della Pace (23 December 1726), † 19 August 1743

6 May 1715 
 Fabio Olivieri, secretary of the Apostolic Briefs – cardinal-deacon of SS. Vito e Modesto (received the title on 23 September 1715), † 9 February 1738

29 May 1715 
 Henri Pons de Thiard de Bissy, bishop of Meaux – cardinal-priest of SS. Quirico e Giulitta (received the title on 16 June 1721), then cardinal-priest of S. Bernardo alle Terme (14 August 1730), † 26 July 1737
 Innico Caracciolo, bishop of Aversa (created in pectore, published on 16 December 1715) – cardinal-priest of S. Tommaso in Parione (received the title on 30 March 1716), † 6 September 1730
 Bernardino Scotti, vice-camerlengo of the Holy Roman Church and governor of Rome (created in pectore, published on 16 December 1715) – cardinal-priest of S. Pietro in Montorio (received the title on 5 February 1716), † 16 November 1726
 Carlo Maria Marini (created in pectore, published on 16 December 1715) – cardinal-deacon of S. Maria in Aquiro (received the title on 6 February 1716), then cardinal-deacon of SS. Vito e Modesto (23 June 1738), cardinal-deacon of S. Agata in Suburra (15 July 1739), cardinal-deacon of S. Maria in Via Lata (7 August 1741), † 16 January 1747

16 December 1715 
 Nicolò Caracciolo, archbishop of Capua – cardinal-priest of SS. Silvestro e Martino (received the title on 6 February 1716), † 7 February 1728
 Giovanni Patrizi, titular archbishop of Seleucia – cardinal-priest of SS. IV Coronati (received the title on 6 February 1716), † 31 July 1727
 Ferdinando Nuzzi, titular archbishop of Nicea, secretary of the S. C. of Bishop and Regulars – cardinal-priest of S. Pudenziana (received the title on 6 February 1716), † 1 December 1717
 Nicolò Spinola, titular archbishop of Tebe – cardinal-priest of S. Sisto (received the title on 8 June 1716), then cardinal-priest of SS. Nereo ed Achilleo (29 January 1725), † 12 April 1735

15 March 1717 

 Giberto Bartolomeo Borromeo, titular patriarch of Antioch and bishop of Novara – cardinal-priest of S. Alessio (received the title on 10 May 1717), † 22 January 1740

12 July 1717 

 Giulio Alberoni – cardinal-deacon of S. Adriano (received the title on 12 June 1724), then cardinal-priest of S. Crisogono (20 September 1728), cardinal-priest of S. Lorenzo in Lucina (29 August 1740), † 26 June 1752
 Imre Csáky, archbishop of Kalocsa-Bacs (created in pectore, published on 1 October 1717) – cardinal-priest of S. Eusebio (received the title on 16 June 1721), † 28 August 1732

29 November 1719 

 Léon Potier de Gesvres, archbishop of Bourges – cardinal-priest without the title, † 12 November 1744
 François de Mailly, archbishop of Reims – cardinal-priest without the title, † 13 September 1721
 Giorgio Spinola, titular archbishop of Cesarea, nuncio in Austria – cardinal-priest of S. Agnese fuori le mura (received the title on 20 January 1721), then cardinal-priest of S. Maria in Trastevere (15 December 1734), cardinal-priest of S. Prassede (16 December 1737), cardinal-bishop of Palestrina (3 September 1738), † 17 January 1739
 Cornelio Bentivoglio, titular archbishop of Cartago, nuncio in France – cardinal-priest of S. Girolamo degli Schiavoni (received the title on 15 April 1721), then cardinal-priest of S. Cecilia (25 June 1727), † 30 December 1732
 Thomas Philip Wallrad de Hénin-Liétard d'Alsace, archbishop of Mechlin – cardinal-priest of S. Cesareo in Palatio (received the title on 16 June 1721), then cardinal-priest of S. Balbina (2 December 1733), cardinal-priest of S. Lorenzo in Lucina (17 July 1752), † 5 January 1759
 Luis Antonio Belluga y Moncada, C.O., bishop of Cartagena – cardinal-priest of S. Maria Traspontina (received the title on 16 June 1721), then cardinal-priest of S. Prisca (20 February 1726), cardinal-priest of S. Maria in Trastevere (16 December 1737), cardinal-priest of S. Prassede (3 September 1738), † 22 February 1743
 José Pereira de Lacerda, bishop of Faro – cardinal-priest of S. Susanna (received the title on 16 June 1721), † 28 September 1738
 Michael Friedrich Althan, bishop of Vác – cardinal-priest of S. Sabina (received the title on 16 September 1720), † 20 June 1734
 Giovanni Battista Salerni, S.J. – cardinal-priest of S. Prisca (received the title on 16 September 1720), then cardinal-priest of S. Stefano al Monte Celio (20 February 1726), † 30 January 1729
 Giovanni Francesco Barbarigo, bishop of Brescia (created in pectore, published on30 September 1720) – cardinal-priest of SS. Marcellino e Pietro (received the title on 20 January 1721), † 26 January 1730

30 September 1720 
 Carlos de Borja y Centellas, patriarch of the West Indies – cardinal-priest of S. Pudenziana (received the title on 16 June 1721), † 8 August 1733
 Álvaro Cienfuegos Villazón, S.J. – cardinal-priest of S. Bartolomeo all'Isola (received the title on 16 June 1721), † 19 August 1739

Sources 

 Remigius Ritzler: Hierarchia Catholica, vol. V, Münster 1952

Clement XI
College of Cardinals
18th-century Catholicism